Sphaerechinorhynchus is a genus of worms belonging to the family Plagiorhynchidae.

The species of this genus are found in Southeastern Asia, Australia.

Species:

Sphaerechinorhynchus macropisthospinus 
Sphaerechinorhynchus maximesospinus 
Sphaerechinorhynchus ophiograndis 
Sphaerechinorhynchus rotundocapitatus 
Sphaerechinorhynchus serpenticola

References

Plagiorhynchidae
Acanthocephala genera